Lacropte is a commune in the Dordogne department, Nouvelle-Aquitaine, southwestern France.

Population

See also
Communes of the Dordogne department

References

Communes of Dordogne